Semon may refer to:

Charles Semon (1814–1877), German and British businessman, politician and philanthropist
Felix Semon (1841–1921), German neurobiologist and laryngologist
Henry Semon (1884–1958), American farmer, businessman, and politician
Larry Semon (1889–1928), American actor, director, producer, and screenwriter during the silent film era
Mo Chuaroc moccu Neth Semon (fl. c. 600?), an Irish monk and scholar of the Early Middle Ages
Richard Semon (1859–1918), German zoologist and evolutionary biologist
Waldo Semon (1898–1999), American inventor born in Demopolis, Alabama

See also
Semon's Leaf-nosed Bat, species of bat in the family Hipposideridae, found in Australia and Papua New Guinea
Semon Knudsen (1912–1998), prominent automobile executive